The 1998 Mid-American Conference baseball tournament took place in May 1998. The top three regular season finishers from each division met in the double-elimination tournament held at Warren E. Steller Field on the campus of Bowling Green State University in Bowling Green, Ohio. This was the tenth Mid-American Conference postseason tournament to determine a champion. The top seed from the east, won their first tournament championship to earn the conference's automatic bid to the 1998 NCAA Division I baseball tournament.

Seeding and format 
The top three finishers in each division, based on conference winning percentage only, participated in the tournament. The top seed in each division played the third seed from the opposite division in the first round. The teams played double-elimination tournament. With the addition of Marshall and return of Northern Illinois to the league, the conference divided again into East and West Divisions and expanded the tournament field to six. All previous tournaments consisted of four participating teams.

Results

All-Tournament Team 
The following players were named to the All-Tournament Team.

Most Valuable Player 
Bob Niemet won the Tournament Most Valuable Player award. Niemet played for Bowling Green.

References 

Tournament
Mid-American Conference Baseball Tournament
Mid-American Conference baseball tournament
Mid-American Conference baseball tournament
College baseball tournaments in Ohio
Bowling Green, Ohio